The following is a list of notable deaths in August 2015.

Entries for each day are listed alphabetically by surname. A typical entry lists information in the following sequence:
Name, age, country of citizenship and reason for notability, established cause of death, reference.

August 2015

1
Stephan Beckenbauer, 46, German footballer (Bayern Munich), brain tumour.
Cilla Black, 72, British singer ("Anyone Who Had a Heart", "You're My World", "Step Inside Love") and TV presenter (Blind Date, Surprise Surprise, The Moment of Truth), stroke following a fall.
Bernard d'Espagnat, 93, French theoretical physicist and philosopher of science.
ABM Elias, 71, Bangladesh army general.
Bob Frankford, 76, Canadian politician.
Mates Friesel, 91, American politician, mayor and founder of New Square, New York (since 1961).
Hank Izquierdo, 84, Cuban baseball player (Minnesota Twins).
Hong Yuanshuo, 67, Chinese football player and coach (Beijing Guoan), colorectal cancer.
Vincent Marotta, 91, American entrepreneur, co-creator of Mr. Coffee.
Sheperd Paine, 69, American military historian and modeler, stroke.
Chiara Pierobon, 22, Italian professional cyclist, suspected pulmonary embolism.

2
Forrest Bird, 94, American Hall of Fame aviator and inventor.
Giovanni Conso, 93, Italian jurist, Minister of Justice (1993–1994).
Sammy Cox, 91, Scottish footballer (Rangers, national team).
Tyler Drumheller, 63, American CIA agent, pancreatic cancer.
Piet Fransen, 79, Dutch footballer (FC Groningen, national team).
Phyllis Grosskurth, 91, Canadian biographer.
Mahmoud Guinia, 64, Moroccan Gnawa musician.
Stephen Huss, 47, Canadian musician (Psyche).
Ken Jones, 85, Welsh author and Buddhist activist.
Ken Lewis, 74, English singer and songwriter (Can't You Hear My Heartbeat), complications from diabetes.
Robert Lukens, 42, American historian and collection manager (United States Capitol Visitor Center), President of the Chester County Historical Society (since 2011), cancer.
Natalia Molchanova, 53, Russian free diver.
J. Durward Morsch, 94, American composer.
Jacques Navadic, 95, French journalist and broadcasting editor.
Adolphe Nshimirimana, 50, Burundian general, Army chief of staff, rocket attack.
June Schwarcz, 97, American enamel artist.
Jack Spring, 82, American baseball player (Los Angeles Angels), Parkinson's disease.
Içami Tiba, 74, Brazilian psychiatrist and writer.

3
Hiroyuki Agawa, 94, Japanese writer.
Jean Aicardi, 88, French neurologist.
Salvatore Cassisa, 93, Italian Roman Catholic prelate, Archbishop of Monreale (1978–1997).
Robert Conquest, 98, British-born American historian (The Great Terror), pneumonia.
Francois Drummer, 76, South African cricketer.
Mel Farr, 70, American football player (Detroit Lions).
Coleen Gray, 92, American actress (Nightmare Alley, Kiss of Death, The Killing).
Chris Hyndman, 49, Canadian TV personality (Steven and Chris).
Carol Brown Janeway, 71, British-born American editor and translator (The Reader), cancer.
Frank Kerns, 82, American college basketball coach (Georgia Southern).
Margot Loyola, 96, Chilean folk singer and musician.
Cynthia Macdonald, 87, American poet, heart failure.
Lynn Manning, 60, American poet, playwright and actor (Seinfeld, 8 Simple Rules), liver cancer.
Jef Murray, 55, American fantasy artist.
Kevin O'Leary, 95, Australian judge.
Johanna Quandt, 89, German businesswoman and billionaire.
Giovanni Riggi, 90, American mobster, inspiration for The Sopranos.
Arnold Scaasi, 85, Canadian fashion designer.
Alf Schwarz, 80, Canadian sociologist.
Ambros Seelos, 80, German musician and conductor.

4
Takashi Amano, 61, Japanese aquarist and photographer, pneumonia.
Ken Barnes, 82, British writer and record producer.
Arthur Dorward, 90, Scottish rugby union player.
Theo van Els, 79, Dutch linguist.
Yosef Goldman, 73, American book dealer and author.
Irving Harper, 99, American industrial designer.
Achim Hill, 80, German rower, two-time Olympic silver medalist (1960, 1964).
Elsie Hillman, 89, American politician and philanthropist.
Les Munro, 96, New Zealand pilot, last surviving pilot of Operation Chastise.
Gerd Natschinski, 86, German composer.
Sam Odaka, 86, Ugandan diplomat and politician, Foreign Minister (1964–1971).
Calle Örnemark, 81, Swedish sculptor.
John Rudometkin, 75, American basketball player (New York Knicks, San Francisco Warriors), lung disease.
Siegfried Schnabl, 88, German psychotherapist.
Billy Sherrill, 78, American record producer (Tammy Wynette, George Jones, Charlie Rich).
Lela Swift, 96, American television director (Dark Shadows, Ryan's Hope).

5
Svetlana Boym, 56, Soviet-born American scholar and author, cancer.
Simon Burrows, 86, British Anglican prelate, Bishop of Buckingham (1974–1994).
George Cole, 90, English actor (Minder, St Trinian's, Cleopatra).
Ana Hatherly, 86, Portuguese writer and artist.
Mark Herdman, 83, British diplomat, Governor of the British Virgin Islands (1986–1991).
Joyce Ingalls, 65, American actress (Paradise Alley).
Arthur Walter James, 103, British journalist, editor of the Times Educational Supplement (1952–1969).
Joseph Kainrad, 83, American judge and politician.
Kiripi Katembo, 36, Congolese photographer and documentary filmmaker, malaria.
James Herbert Laycraft, 91, Canadian lawyer and judge, Chief Justice of the Alberta Court of Appeal (1985–1991).
Raphy Leavitt, 66, Puerto Rican composer and orchestra leader, complications of surgery for artificial hip infection.
Antti Leppänen, 67, Finnish Olympic ice hockey player (1976), (Tappara).
Tony Millington, 72, Welsh footballer (Swansea City, Peterborough United, national team).
Nuri Ok, 72, Turkish judge, Chief Prosecutor of the Court of Cassation (2003–2007).
Onell Soto, 82, Cuban-born Anglican prelate, Bishop of the Diocese of Venezuela.
Akira Tanno, 89, Japanese photographer.
Johnny Tiger Jr., 75, American artist.
Ellen Vogel, 93, Dutch actress (The Knife, Zonder Ernst, Twin Sisters).
Herbert Wise, 90, Austrian-born British television, theatre and film director (I, Claudius, Breaking the Code).

6
Mircea Dobrescu, 84, Romanian flyweight boxer, Olympic silver medalist (1956).
Bradley M. Glass, 84, American politician.
Danny Hegan, 72, Northern Irish footballer (Ipswich Town, Wolves, national team), cancer.
Ray Hill, 39, American football player (Miami Dolphins), colon cancer.
Ulla Lindkvist, 75, Swedish orienteer.
Geoff Mardon, 87, New Zealand speedway rider.
Frederick R. Payne Jr., 104, American brigadier general.
Amado Pineda, 77, Filipino meteorologist, cardiac arrest.
Orna Porat, 91, German-born Israeli theater actress.
Charl Van Den Berg, 33, South African model, Mr Gay World 2010, lymphoma.

7
Sólveig Anspach, 54, Icelandic-born French film director (Lulu femme nue), cancer.
Trevor Barber, 90, New Zealand cricketer (Wellington, Central Districts, national team).
Manuel Contreras, 86, Chilean general, head of Dirección de Inteligencia Nacional, convicted of crimes against humanity, multiple organ failure.
Saud al-Dosari, 46, Saudi television presenter (MBC), heart attack.
Terrence Evans, 81, American actor (Terminator 2: Judgment Day, Star Trek, The Texas Chainsaw Massacre).
Art Finley, 88, American broadcaster, heart attack.
Lee Seng Wee, 85, Singaporean banker, businessman and billionaire.
Samuil Lurie, 73, Russian literary historian.
Jerome G. Miller, 83, American youth social worker.
Bob Morton, 81, American politician.
Neville Neville, 65, British cricketer and football club director (Bury F.C.), heart attack.
Frances Oldham Kelsey, 101, Canadian-born American physician, Food and Drug Administration reviewer.
Jerry Snell, 56, Canadian actor and musician.
Louise Suggs, 91, American Hall of Fame professional golfer, co-founder of LPGA.
Uggie, 13, American canine actor (The Artist, Water for Elephants, The Campaign), euthanized.
Wei Jianxing, 84, Chinese politician.

8
Sir Alec Atkinson, 96, British WWII air force officer and civil servant.
Chris Decker, 73, Canadian politician, cancer.
David Dill, 60, American politician, member of the Minnesota House of Representatives (since 2003), cancer.
Ronald Gordon, 88, British Anglican prelate, Bishop of Portsmouth (1975–1984) and Bishop at Lambeth (1984–1992).
Jack Jackson, 90, Canadian ice hockey player (Chicago Blackhawks).
Jennifer Jackson, 63, Canadian Olympic speed skater.
Christopher Marshall, 66, British cancer researcher, colorectal cancer.
Ann McGovern, 85, American author, cancer.
Gus Mortson, 90, Canadian ice hockey player (Toronto Maple Leafs, Chicago Black Hawks).
Mauk Moruk, 60, East Timorese rebel commander, shot.
Sean Price, 43, American rapper (Heltah Skeltah, Boot Camp Clik).
Susan Sheridan, 68, English actress and voice artist (The Black Cauldron, The Hitchhiker's Guide to the Galaxy, Noddy's Toyland Adventures), breast cancer.
Abner Shimony, 87, American physicist and philosopher.
Sam S. Walker, 90, American army general.
Farida Yasmin, 75, Bangladeshi playback singer.

9
Rasim Aliyev, 30, Azerbaijani journalist, internal bleeding from a beating.
Marco Antonio Andino, 60, Honduran politician, MP (since 2006), heart attack.
Astaire, 4, Irish-bred British-trained thoroughbred racehorse, colic.
Jean Byrne, 88, American educator, First Lady of New Jersey (1974–1982), babesiosis.
Asmund Ekern, 85, Norwegian biologist.
Jim Gaffney, 94, American football player (Washington Redskins).
Frank Gifford, 84, American Hall of Fame football player (New York Giants) and broadcaster (Monday Night Football).
Jack Gold, 85, British film director (The Naked Civil Servant, Aces High, The Medusa Touch).
John Henry Holland, 86, American computer scientist.
Don Kent, 71, American blues historian and record collector.
Pietro Armando Lavini, 88, Italian Capuchin friar and conservationist.
Walter Nahún López, 37, Honduran footballer, shot.
David Nobbs, 80, British novelist and comedy writer (The Fall and Rise of Reginald Perrin, The Two Ronnies, Fairly Secret Army).
Jonathan Ollivier, 38, British ballet dancer, traffic collision.
Fikret Otyam, 88, Turkish painter and journalist, renal failure.
Kayyar Kinhanna Rai, 100, Indian independence activist, author, poet and journalist, pneumonia.
Wang Jiexi, 25, Chinese actor, leukaemia.

10
Buddy Baker, 74, American Hall of Fame NASCAR driver and commentator (CBS Sports), lung cancer.
Endre Czeizel, 80, Hungarian geneticist, leukemia.
Sunil Das, 76, Indian artist.
Fred Eckhardt, 89, American beer expert.
Sergio Espinoza, 86, Chilean footballer.
Herbert Fielding, 92, American politician, member of the South Carolina Senate (1985–1992).
Boris Gostev, 87, Russian politician, Minister of Finance of the Soviet Union (1985–1989).
Hubert Haenel, 73, French politician and magistrate, member of the Constitutional Council (since 2010).
Cleo Hill, 77, American basketball player (St. Louis Hawks).
Karst Hoogsteen, 91, Dutch-born American biochemist.
Biff Liff, 96, American theatrical agent.
Oscar Lukefahr, 76, American Catholic priest and author.
Donald P. McInnes, 81, Canadian politician.
Knut Osnes, 93, Norwegian football player and manager (Lyn).
David Shelley, 57, American blues rock musician, cancer.
Edward Thomas, 95, American police officer.
Eriek Verpale, 63, Belgian writer.

11
Serge Collot, 91, French violist.
Eddie Cusic, 89, American blues musician, prostate cancer.
Utta Danella, 95, German author. (death announced on this date)
Jim Freeman, 101, American football player and coach (Ball State Cardinals).
Randy Glasbergen, 58, American cartoonist (The Better Half), cardiac arrest.
Leon R. Hartshorn, 86, American theologian and author.
Arturo Macapagal, 72, Filipino Olympic shooter (1972, 1976), prostate cancer.
William J. Moore, 92, American politician.
George A. Murphy, 92, American politician, New York State Senator (1971–1972), Assemblyman (1973–1978) and Supreme Court judge (1978–1997), complications of a stroke.
Harald Nielsen, 73, Danish footballer (Bologna, national team).
Richard Oriani, 95, El Salvador-born American chemical engineer.
Bhalchandra Pendharkar, 93, Indian actor.
* Nour El-Sherif, 69, Egyptian actor and conspiracy theorist, lung cancer.
Richard S. Ross, 91, American cardiologist.
Anne Strieber, 68, American author and editor.
Magomed Suleimanov, 39, Russian Islamist, Emir of the Caucasus Emirate (2015).
Philip Arthur Whitcombe, 92, English cricketer and army officer.
Wendell Wood, 65, American environmental activist, co-founder of Oregon Wild, heart attack.

12
Per Hjort Albertsen, 96, Norwegian composer.
Paul Antrobus, 80, Canadian Baptist minister and psychologist.
Jaakko Hintikka, 86, Finnish philosopher and logician.
Ali Hassanein, 76, Egyptian actor, liver cancer.
Radhey Shyam Kori, 76, Indian politician.
Stephen Lewis, 88, British comedy actor (On the Buses, Last of the Summer Wine, Don't Drink the Water).
Meshulim Feish Lowy, 94, Hungarian-born Canadian rabbi.
Chris Marustik, 54, Welsh footballer (Swansea City, Cardiff City, Newport County, national team).
Kim Nelson, 57, Australian artist, heart attack.
John Scott, 59, English organist and choirmaster, cardiac arrest.
Frank Scully, 95, Australian politician.
Ihor Yeremeyev, 47, Ukrainian politician, member of the Verkhovna Rada (2002–2005, since 2012), head injury.

13
Watban Ibrahim al-Tikriti, 62–63, Iraqi politician, Interior Minister of Iraq (1991–1995), heart attack.
Bill Aswad, 93, American politician, member of the Vermont House of Representatives (1995–2012).
Steve Brennan, 56, English footballer (Crystal Palace).
Bob Fillion, 95, Canadian ice hockey player (Montreal Canadiens).
Danford B. Greene, 87, American film editor (MASH, Blazing Saddles, Who's Harry Crumb?).
Jan Montyn, 90, Dutch artist.
Om Prakash Munjal, 86, Indian chief executive.
John A. Nerud, 102, American Thoroughbred horse trainer and owner.
Harold Ousley, 86, American jazz saxophonist.
Shlomo Smiltiner, 99, Israeli chess player.

14
Leo de Bever, 85, Dutch architect.
Agustín Cejas, 70, Argentine footballer (Racing Club), Alzheimer's disease.
Dickinson R. Debevoise, 91, American judge, U. S. District Court Judge for New Jersey (1979–1994).
Bob Farrell, 87, American restaurateur and motivational speaker, founder of Farrell's Ice Cream Parlour.
Leo Antony Gleaton, 67, American photographer, oral cancer.
Hans Hüneke, 81, German Olympic athlete.
Bob Johnston, 83, American record producer (Johnny Cash, Bob Dylan, Leonard Cohen).
Lavanam, 86, Indian social reformer.
Joseph Reid, 97, Canadian politician.
*Rogelio Ricardo Livieres Plano, 69, Argentinian-born Paraguayan Roman Catholic prelate, Bishop of Ciudad del Este (2004–2014), diabetes.
Karen Stives, 64, American equestrian, Olympic champion and silver medallist (1984).
Jazz Summers, 71, English music manager (Scissor Sisters, The Verve, Snow Patrol), lung cancer.

15
Jean Bikomagu, Burundian military officer, Army Chief of Staff during the Burundian Civil War, shot.
Julian Bond, 75, American civil rights activist and politician, chairman of the NAACP (1998–2010), complications of vascular disease.
Rafael Chirbes, 66, Spanish writer, lung cancer.
Malcolm Craddock, 77, British television producer (Sharpe).
Doc Daugherty, 87, American baseball player (Detroit Tigers).
Jorge de la Rúa, 73, Argentine lawyer and politician.
John Ewington, 79, British insurance underwriter, Chairman of the Guild of Church Musicians (1978-2014).
Guy Garman, 56, American physician and scuba diver, drowned.
Hamid Gul, 80, Pakistani army officer, brain haemorrhage.
Gordy Holz, 82, American football player (Denver Broncos, New York Jets).
Bill Kushner, 84, American poet.
Geoff McGivern, 84, Australian footballer (Melbourne F.C.).
Manuel Mendívil, 79, Mexican equestrian, Olympic medalist (1980).
Ibtihal Salem, 66, Egyptian author.
Danny Sembello, 52, American songwriter ("Neutron Dance") and record producer, drowned.
Derwyn Shea, 77, Canadian politician, cancer.
Bud Thomas, 86, American baseball player (St. Louis Browns).

16
Jacob Bekenstein, 68, Mexican-born Israeli-American theoretical physicist.
Melva Bucksbaum, 82, American art collector, bladder cancer.
Alfred Burrows, 63, Indian cricketer.
Jon Craig, 73, New Zealand architect.
Emma Didlake, 110, American WWII soldier.
Joan Fawcett, 78, Canadian politician.
Sylvia Hitchcock, 69, American model and beauty queen (Miss Universe 1967), cancer.
Anna Kashfi, 80, Indian-born British actress.
Shuja Khanzada, 71, Pakistani politician, member of the Provincial Assembly of the Punjab (2002–2007, since 2008), bombing.
Katia Loritz, 82, Swiss-born Spanish actress.
Kitty McGeever, 48, British actress (Emmerdale), diabetic retinopathy and kidney failure.
George Merchant, 89, Scottish footballer (Dundee FC, Falkirk FC).
Mile Mrkšić, 68, Serbian Yugoslav military officer and convicted war criminal.
David A. Prior, 59, American film director (Zombie Wars, Raw Justice, Deadly Prey).
Lenny B. Robinson, 51, American Batman impersonator, traffic collision.
Peter W. Schramm, 68, Hungarian-born American political scientist, cancer.
Draga Stamejčič, 78, Slovenian Yugoslav athlete.
Lyubov Volkova, 82, Soviet Olympic skier.

17
Loek Alflen, 81, Dutch wrestler.
Butz Aquino, 76, Filipino politician, member of the Senate (1987–1995) and the House of Representatives from Makati's Second District (1998–2007).
William B. Bonnor, 94, British physicist and mathematician, heart attack.
Beata Brookes, 84, British politician, MEP for North Wales (1979–1989).
Yvonne Craig, 78, American actress (Batman, Star Trek, Olivia), breast cancer.
Arsen Dedić, 77, Croatian singer.
Mike Gaechter, 75, American football player (Dallas Cowboys), heart failure.
George Gair, 88, New Zealand politician and diplomat, MP for North Shore (1966–1990), Mayor of North Shore City (1995–1998), High Commissioner to the UK (1991–1994).
Eduardo Guerrero, 87, Argentine rower, Olympic champion (1952), pneumonia.
Sandy Kennon, 81, South African footballer (Norwich City).
Gerhard Mayer-Vorfelder, 82, German football executive (UEFA, VfB Stuttgart) and politician.
László Paskai, 88, Hungarian Roman Catholic prelate, Archbishop of Esztergom-Budapest (1987–2002), Cardinal (1988–2015).
Bernard Rodrigues, 82, Singaporean politician, co-founder of PAP and NTUC, Member of Parliament for Telok Blangah (1965–1968).
Dahd Sfeir, 83, Uruguayan actress.
Albert Vërria, 78, Albanian actor.

18
Karolyn Ali, 70, American film producer (Tupac: Resurrection).
Khaled al-Asaad, 83, Syrian scholar, head of antiquities in Palmyra, beheaded.
Nils Bølset, 87, Norwegian diplomat.
Hugh Courtenay, 18th Earl of Devon, 73, British landowner and peer.
Vladimír Filo, 75, Slovak Roman Catholic prelate, Bishop of Rožňava (2008–2015).
Russell Henderson, 91, Trinidadian-born British jazz musician.
Kay McFarland, 80, American judge, Kansas Supreme Court Justice (1977–2009).
Rama Messinger, 46, Israeli actress and voice actress, cancer.
Suvra Mukherjee, 74, Indian philosopher and dancer, First Lady (since 2012), respiratory failure.
Donald Eugene O'Brien, 91, American judge, U. S. District Court Judge for the Southern District of Iowa (1978–1990) and the Northern District, (1978–1992).
Charles Read, 57, British mathematician.
Edgar Rumney, 78, English footballer (Colchester United).
Joe Skibinski, 86, American football player (Green Bay Packers).
Roger Smalley, 72, British-born Australian composer, Parkinson's disease.
William Jay Smith, 97, American poet.
Louis Stokes, 90, American politician, member of the U.S. House of Representatives from Ohio (1969–1999), lung and brain cancer.
Abu Muslim al-Turkmani, Iraqi member of Mujahideen Shura Council, senior deputy commander and primary coordinator of ISIS, airstrike.
Bud Yorkin, 89, American film and television director, producer (All in the Family, Maude, Sanford and Son) and actor.

19
Nazzal al-Armouti, 91, Jordanian civil servant, diplomat and politician.
Egon Bahr, 93, German politician.
Paravoor Bharathan, 86, Indian actor.
Ole Jacob Frich, 61, Norwegian politician, cancer.
Fernand Grosjean, 91, Swiss Olympic alpine skier (1948, 1952).
George Houser, 99, American Methodist minister and civil rights activist.
Paul Lokiru Kalanda, 88, Ugandan Roman Catholic prelate, Bishop of Moroto (1980–1991) and Fort Portal (1991–2003).
Antonio Larreta, 92, Uruguayan writer and actor.
Sanat Mehta, 90, Indian politician.
Russell Poole, 58, American police detective (LAPD), heart attack.
Doudou N'Diaye Rose, 85, Senegalese drummer, composer and bandleader.
Leonard A. Sawyer, 90, American politician, member of the Washington House of Representatives (1955-1975).
Suharno, 55, Indonesian football player and coach, heart attack.
Chitranjan Swaroop, 69, Indian politician.

20
Khalid Hassan Abbas, 79, Sudanese army general and politician.
Moza Sultan Al Kaabi, 31, Emirati orthopedic surgeon, traffic collision.
Lars Amble, 76, Swedish actor and director, cancer.
Armin, Prince of Lippe, 91, German nobleman, head of the former reigning family of the Principality of Lippe.
D. Dudley Bloom, 92, American businessman.
Zuzana Brabcová, 56, Czech author.
Veronica Brady, 86, Australian nun and academic.
Lev Durov, 83, Russian actor.
Kenneth Jennings, 90, American choral conductor and composer.
Paul Kibblewhite, 74, New Zealand pulp and paper scientist.
Lina Morgan, 78, Spanish actress and showgirl.
Melody Patterson, 66, American actress (F Troop), multiple organ failure.
Daniel Reimold, 34, American journalism professor (Saint Joseph's University), journalist (PBS MediaShift) and blogger.
Harry Volkman, 89, American meteorologist, respiratory failure.
Frank Wilkes, 93, Australian politician, member of the Victorian Legislative Assembly for Northcote (1957–1988), Leader of the Opposition (1977–1981).

21
Ton Alblas, 75, Dutch politician, member of the House of Representatives (2002–2003).
Colin Beyer, 76, New Zealand lawyer and businessman.
Jimmy Evert, 91, American tennis player and coach, Canadian Open champion (1947), pneumonia.
Sir Bob Hepple, 81, South African-born British legal scholar, Master of Clare College, Cambridge (1993–2003).
Denise Marshall, 53, British equal rights campaigner, cancer.
Jimmy Massey, 85, American racing car driver.
Sasha Petraske, 42, American cocktail bar entrepreneur.
Daniel Rabinovich, 71, Argentine musician and comedian (Les Luthiers).
Jere Ratcliffe, 78, American Chief Scout Executive of the Boy Scouts of America (1993–2000).
Ruth Sivard, 99, American economist, dementia.
Gerry Steinberg, 70, British politician, MP for City of Durham (1987–2005).
Toby Sheldon, 34, American television reality star (Botched, My Strange Addiction), multiple drug intoxication.
Wang Dongxing, 99, Chinese politician, Vice Chairman of the Communist Party (1977–1980).

22
Mariem Hassan, 57, Western Saharan singer, bone cancer.
Keith K. Hilbig, 73, American Mormon general authority.
Ieng Thirith, 83, Cambodian Khmer Rouge politician, Minister of Social Affairs (1975–1979), complications from Alzheimer's disease.
Tommy Lowry, 69, English footballer (Crewe Alexandra).
Andy Mapple, 52, British water skier, heart attack.
Arthur Morris, 93, Australian Test cricketer.
Merl Reagle, 65, American crossword compiler (San Francisco Chronicle), acute pancreatitis.
Stephen Rodefer, 74, American poet and painter.
William L. Rowe, 84, American philosopher.
Jörg Schneider, 80, Swiss actor (Usfahrt Oerlike) and comedian, liver cancer.
Josef Steger, 90, Swiss Olympic sprinter.
Marion Boulton Stroud, 76, American museum director (The Fabric Workshop and Museum).
Eric Thompson, 95, British racing driver.
Charles Tomlinson, 88, English poet and poetry translator.
Inez Trueman, 98, Canadian politician.
Lou Tsioropoulos, 84, American basketball player (Boston Celtics).
Tatu Vanhanen, 86, Finnish political scientist.
Jakub Zabłocki, 31, Polish footballer, heart attack.
Erika Zuchold, 68, German gymnast, Olympic bronze (1968) and silver (1968, 1972) medalist.

23
Gaston Adjoukoua, 57, Ivorian footballer.
Augusta Chiwy, 94, Congolese-born Belgian nurse, volunteer in the Siege of Bastogne.
Mark Costello, 59, American politician, Oklahoma Labor Commissioner (since 2011), stabbed.
Ricardo García Sainz, 85, Mexican administrator and politician, Federal deputy (1997–2000).
Helen Kemp, 97, American singing teacher and choir director.
Grover Klemmer, 94, American athlete (California Golden Bears) and track coach (CCSF).
Guy Ligier, 85, French rugby union player (national team), racing driver and Formula One team owner (Équipe Ligier).
Eugenio Méndez Docurro, 92, Mexican politician and engineer, Secretary of Communications and Transportation (1970–1976).
Mary Lou Parks, 76, American politician.
Yosi Piamenta, 63, Israeli musician, cancer.
Enrique Reneau, 44, Honduran footballer, respiratory failure.
Paul Royle, 101, Australian prisoner-of-war, escapee from Stalag Luft III.
Michel Varga, 88, Hungarian-born French political activist.

24
Niels Henrik Arendt, 64, Danish Church of Denmark prelate, Bishop of Haderslev (1999–2013).
Eric Barry, 88, Canadian army officer, Lord Prior of St John (2002-2008).
John H. Beynon, 91, Welsh chemist and physicist.
Marcy Borders, 42, American 9/11 survivor, subject of "Dust Lady" photograph, stomach cancer.
Cummy Burton, 79, Canadian ice hockey player (Detroit Red Wings).
Charlie Coffey, 81, American football player and coach (Virginia Tech Hokies), cancer.
Peter Ebinger, 56, Austrian Olympic equestrian.
Peter Gatenby, 92, Irish professor of clinical medicine.
Cees van Kooten, 67, Dutch footballer (Go Ahead Eagles, national team), esophageal cancer.
Alison Magaya, South Sudanese politician and diplomat.
Chico Maki, 76, Canadian ice hockey player (Chicago Blackhawks).
Marguerite McDonald, 73, Canadian radio and television journalist, cancer.
David Michie, 87, French-born British painter.
Sándor Nagy, 68, Hungarian politician, MP (1980–1985, 1988–1990, 1994–2006).
Venkatesh Nayak, 79, Indian politician, member of the Legislative Assembly for Karnataka (since 2013), train derailment.
Bevo Nordmann, 75, American basketball player (Cincinnati Royals, St. Louis Hawks, New York Knicks), cancer.
Nathan Rosenberg, 87, American economist.
Vardo Rumessen, 73, Estonian musicologist and politician, member of the Riigikogu (1992–1995, 1999–2003).
Gerhard Spiegler, 85, Lithuanian-born American academic.
Joseph F. Traub, 83, American computer scientist.
Justin Wilson, 37, British IndyCar Series driver, head injuries from race collision.
Annette Worsley-Taylor, 71, British fashion promoter.

25
Mario Aguiñada Carranza, 73, Salvadoran activist and politician, MP (1991–1994).
José María Benegas, 67, Spanish politician, cancer.
Gaetano Aldo Donato, 74, American Roman Catholic prelate, Auxiliary Bishop of Newark (since 2004).
James "Red" Duke, 86, American trauma surgeon.
Endre Fejes, 91, Hungarian writer.
James L. Flanagan, 89, American electrical engineer, heart failure.
Colin Fry, 53, British medium and television presenter, lung cancer.
Mascarenhas, 78, Angolan footballer.
Frank E. Petersen, 83, American military officer, lung cancer.
Francis Sejersted, 79, Norwegian history professor, chairman of the Norwegian Nobel Committee (1991–1999).
Ian Smith, 90, South African cricketer.

26
Georges Abi-Saber, 92, Lebanese-born Canadian Maronite hierarch, Bishop of Latakia (1977–1986) and Saint Maron of Montreal (1990–1996).
Amelia Boynton Robinson, 104, American civil rights activist, multiple strokes.
Donald Eric Capps, 76, American theologian, traffic collision.
Keith Everitt, 92, Canadian politician, MLA for St. Albert (1971–1979).
Camellia Johnson, 61, American opera singer, heart failure.
Geraint Stanley Jones, 79, Welsh television executive, controller of BBC Wales (1981–1989), chief executive of S4C (1989–1994).
P. J. Kavanagh, 84, English poet and actor.
Peter Kern, 66, Austrian actor and filmmaker (The Last Summer of the Rich).
Stefanos Manikas, 63, Greek politician, Minister of State (2001–2003), cancer.
Owe Nordqvist, 87, Swedish Olympic cyclist.
Carmelo Domênico Recchia, 93, Italian-born Brazilian Roman Catholic prelate, last Territorial Abbot of Claraval (1976–1999).
Maroun Khoury Sader, 88, Lebanese Maronite hierarch, Archbishop of Tyre (1992–2003).
Francisco San Diego, 79, Filipino Roman Catholic prelate, Bishop of San Pablo (1995–2003) and Pasig (2003–2010).
Győző Soós, 66, Hungarian politician, MP (1994–2006).
David M. Stanley, 86, American politician.
Anita Yeckel, 72, American politician, member of the Missouri Senate (1997–2005), heart disease.
American journalists killed as a result of the WDBJ shooting:
Vester Flanagan, 41, reporter (WTOC, WTWC, WDBJ) and gunman, suicide by gunshot.
Alison Parker, 24, reporter (WDBJ), shot.
Adam Ward, 27, cameraman (WDBJ) and photojournalist, shot.

27
Adebowale Adefuye, 68, Nigerian diplomat, Ambassador to the United States (since 2010), heart attack.
Kazi Zafar Ahmed, 76, Bangladeshi politician, Prime Minister (1989-1990).
Monique Berlioux, 89, French Olympic swimmer.
Matei Boilă, 89, Romanian politician and Greek Catholic priest, Senator (1992–2000).
Pascal Chaumeil, 54, French director (Heartbreaker, A Long Way Down, A Perfect Plan), cancer.
George Cleve, 79, Austrian-born American musical conductor, liver failure.
Darryl Dawkins, 58, American basketball player (Philadelphia 76ers, New Jersey Nets), heart attack.
Mervyn Edmunds, 83, New Zealand cricketer.
Joan Garriga, 52, Spanish motorcycle racer, traffic collision.
James A. Hefner, 76, American educator, President of Tennessee State University (1991–2005), colon cancer.
Gino Hollander, 91, American artist, heart attack.
Zafar Hussain Mirza, 88, Pakistani judge.
Rolf Nitzsche, 84, German Olympic cyclist (1956).
Marc Rosenberg, 65, Canadian judge, brain cancer.
Willy Stähle, 61, Dutch water skier, Olympic (1972) and world champion (1971).

28
Juan Amores, 51, Costa Rican Olympic athlete.
Jan Anderson, 83, New Zealand scientist.
Al Arbour, 82, Canadian ice hockey player (Chicago Blackhawks, St. Louis Blues) and Hall of Fame coach (New York Islanders).
John Buckingham, 72, British chemist.
Lindsay Charnock, 60, British jockey.
Teresa Gorman, 83, British politician, MP for Billericay (1987-2001).
Mark Krasniqi, 94, Kosovan ethnographer and politician.
Joan Lind, 62, American rower, two-time Olympic silver medalist (1976, 1984), brain cancer.
Paulo Machava, 61, Mozambican journalist, shot.
Wally McArthur, 81, Australian rugby league player (Rochdale Hornets).
Ray Miron, 92, Canadian ice hockey executive (Central Hockey League, Toronto Maple Leafs, Colorado Rockies).
Roland Mqwebu, 74, South African actor.
Nasser Pourpirar, 75, Iranian writer and revisionist historian.
Nelson Shanks, 77, American painter, cancer.
Józef Wesołowski, 67, Polish defrocked Roman Catholic prelate, archbishop and Vatican envoy to the Dominican Republic (2008–2013).

29
Endre Alexander Balazs, 95, Hungarian-born American ophthalmologist, stroke.
Robin Bilbie, 73, English cricketer (Nottinghamshire).
Carlos María Ariz Bolea, 86, Spanish-born Panamanian Roman Catholic prelate, Vicar Apostolic of Darién (1981–1988) and Bishop of Colón-Kuna Yala (1988–2005).
William McCormick Blair Jr., 98, American diplomat, Ambassador to Denmark (1961–1964) and the Philippines (1964–1967), hypertension.
Wayne Dyer, 75, American self-help author and motivational speaker, leukemia.
Milorad Ekmečić, 86, Serbian historian.
Joy Golden, 85, American advertising executive.
Margaret Hurley, 105, American politician, member of the Washington House of Representatives (1953–1979) and Senate (1979–1984).
*Kyle Jean-Baptiste, 21, American theater actor (Les Misérables), fall.
Graham Leggat, 81, Scottish footballer (Aberdeen, Fulham, national team).
Nikolaus Lehnhoff, 76, German opera director.
Jean Louvet, 80, Belgian playwright.
*Luo Lan, 95, Taiwanese writer and radio personality, cardiopulmonary failure.
Frankie Rivera, 38, American native rights activist, brain cancer.
Ron Searle, 96, British-born Canadian politician, Mayor of Mississauga (1976–1978).
Sir Kenneth Stowe, 88, British civil servant.

30
Brad Anderson, 91, American cartoonist (Marmaduke).
Carlos Barrionuevo, 37, Argentine footballer, drowned.
Charlie Carlson, 71, American novelist, actor and film producer.
Wes Craven, 76, American film director, writer and producer (A Nightmare on Elm Street, Scream, The Hills Have Eyes), brain cancer.
Bart Cummings, 87, Australian racehorse trainer, twelve-time winner of the Melbourne Cup.
Blondell Cummings, 70, American modern dancer and choreographer.
Edward Fadeley, 85, American attorney and politician, heart failure.
George Fisher, 90, English footballer (Millwall, Colchester United).
Brian Hord, 81, British chartered surveyor and politician, MEP for London West (1979–1984).
John Hotop, 85, New Zealand rugby union player (Bush, Manawatu, Canterbury, Otago, national team).
Dan Iordăchescu, 85, Romanian baritone.
M. M. Kalburgi, 76, Indian writer and academic, shot.
Marvin Mandel, 95, American politician, Governor of Maryland (1969–1979), Speaker of the House of Delegates (1964–1969).
J. Donald Millar, 81, American physician and public-health official, kidney failure.
Joshua Park, 38, American theater actor (The Adventures of Tom Sawyer).
Pierfranco Pastore, 88, Italian Roman Catholic prelate, Secretary for Social Communications (1984–2003).
George Hamilton Pearce, 94, American-born Fijian Roman Catholic prelate, Archbishop of Suva (1967–1976).
Hugo Rasmussen, 74, Danish jazz musician.
Oliver Sacks, 82, British neurologist and author (The Man Who Mistook His Wife for a Hat, Awakenings, Hallucinations), liver cancer.
Héctor Silva, 75, Uruguayan footballer, heart attack.
Natalia Strelchenko, 38, Russian-born Norwegian concert pianist, head and neck injuries.
Mikhail Svetin, 84, Ukrainian-born Russian actor.
Ali Tabatabaei, 31, Iranian actor, heart attack.
David Williamson, Baron Williamson of Horton, 81, British civil servant and peer, Convenor of the Cross-Bench Peers (2004–2007).

31
Joy Beverley, 91, British singer (Beverley Sisters), stroke.
Barbara Brecht-Schall, 84, German actress.
Cipe Lincovsky, 85, Argentine actress (The Girlfriend, Poor Butterfly'').
* Edward Montagu, 3rd Baron Montagu of Beaulieu, 88, British peer, founder of the National Motor Museum.
Vera B. Rison, 76, American politician, member of the Michigan House of Representatives (1997-2003).
Tom Scott, 84, American football player (Philadelphia Eagles, New York Giants).
Islam Timurziev, 32, Russian boxer, sepsis.

References

2015-08
 08